S. Fischer Verlag is a major German publishing house, which has operated as a division of Holtzbrinck Publishing Group since 1962. The publishing house was founded in 1881 by Samuel Fischer in Berlin, but is currently based in Frankfurt am Main, and is traditionally counted among the most prestigious publishing houses in the German-speaking world.

History
Originally, it was renowned for naturalistic literature. Famous authors include Gerhart Hauptmann and Thomas Mann, both awarded the Nobel Prize in literature.

After the Nazis came  to power in Germany, the Jewish family of owner Gottfried Bermann-Fischer fled and founded a branch of their publishing house in Vienna. Those who remained in Berlin kept the official name "S. Fischer Verlag" and were led by Peter Suhrkamp.

After the Second World War, disputes over the future of the publishing house arose between Suhrkamp and Fischer. This led to an out-of-court agreement, resulting in a sort of bisection of the S. Fischer Verlag: Bermann-Fischer regained control from Peter Suhrkamp, but Suhrkamp founded his own Suhrkamp publishing house in 1950, and authors could choose which publishing house they wanted to be published by in future. Ultimately, 33 of the 48 authors, among them Bertolt Brecht, Hermann Hesse, T. S. Eliot and George Bernard Shaw, decided to change to Suhrkamp.

Among the imprints of Fischer are Fischer Taschenbuch Verlag, Argon Verlag and Scherz Verlag. Today the S. Fischer Verlag, as well as other publishers, such as  Kindler, Rowohlt, and Kiepenheuer & Witsch and Metzler, are part of Holtzbrinck, a publishing group. Holtzbrinck bought S. Fischer in 1963.

Edition Peters — a prominent publisher for worldwide music — was located next door to them, but in 2014 moved to Leipzig.

Controversies 
In 2015, S. Fischer Verlag sued US-based Project Gutenberg in German court for copyright infringement of 18 works by Heinrich Mann, Thomas Mann and Alfred Döblin. The works are in the public domain in the US, but still copyrighted under German law. This was only possible by the German court ignoring international treaties such as the Berne Convention. As per international law, the court case should have taken place in the USA rather than Germany, as S. Fischer Verlag has a presence in the United States under the name Macmillan, while Project Gutenberg has no presence in Germany. In February 2018 Project Gutenberg responded to the German court's judgement by blocking all access to Project Gutenberg from IP addresses in Germany, making the full content of Project Gutenberg inaccessible for German residents.

Further reading
Martin Mauthner: German Writers in French Exile, 1933-1940, Vallentine Mitchell, London 2007,

References

External links
 
At Holtzbrinck

Book publishing companies of Germany
Holtzbrinck Publishing Group
Companies based in Frankfurt
Mass media in Frankfurt
Publishing companies established in 1886
1886 establishments in Germany